The Telharmonium (also known as the Dynamophone) was an early electrical organ, developed by Thaddeus Cahill c. 1896 and patented in 1897. The electrical signal from the Telharmonium was transmitted over wires; it was heard on the receiving end by means of "horn" speakers.

Like the later Hammond organ, the Telharmonium used tonewheels to generate musical sounds as electrical signals by additive synthesis. It is considered to be the first electromechanical musical instrument.

History
Cahill built three versions: The Mark I weighed 7 tons. The Mark II weighed almost 200 tons, as did the Mark III. Each was a considerable advancement over the features of its predecessor. A small number of performances were given for live audiences, in addition to the telephone transmissions. Performances in New York City (some at "Telharmonic Hall", 39th and Broadway) were well received by the public in 1906, with Mark Twain among the appreciative audience.  In these presentations, the performer sat at a console to control the instrument. The actual mechanism was so large it occupied an entire room; wires from the controlling console were fed discreetly through holes in the auditorium floor, into the instrument room below.

The Telharmonium foreshadowed modern electronic musical equipment in a number of ways. For instance, its sound output came in the form of connecting ordinary telephone receivers to large paper cones—a primitive form of loudspeaker. Cahill stated that electromagnetic diaphragms were the most preferable means of outputting its distinctive sound.  There are no known recordings of its music.

The Telharmonium's demise came for a number of reasons. The instrument was immense in size and weight. This being an age before vacuum tubes had been invented, it required large electric dynamos which consumed great amounts of power in order to generate sufficiently strong audio signals. In addition, problems began to arise when telephone broadcasts of Telharmonium music were subject to crosstalk and unsuspecting telephone users would be interrupted by strange electronic music. By 1912, interest in this revolutionary instrument had changed, and Cahill's company was declared not successful in 1914.

Cahill died in 1934; his younger brother retained the Mark I for decades,  but was unable to interest anyone in it. This was the last version to be scrapped, in 1962.

Design

Telharmonium tones were described as "clear and pure" — referring to the electronic sine wave tones it was capable of producing. However, it was not restricted to such simple sounds. Each tonewheel of the instrument corresponded to a single note, and, to broaden its possibilities, Cahill added several extra tonewheels to add harmonics to each note. This, combined with organ-like stops and multiple keyboards (the Telharmonium was polyphonic), as well as a number of foot pedals, meant that every sound could be sculpted and reshaped — the instrument was noted for its ability to reproduce the sounds of common orchestral woodwind instruments such as the flute, bassoon, clarinet, and also the cello. The Telharmonium needed 671 kilowatts of power:233 and had 153 keys that allowed it to work properly.

See also
Trautonium

Notes

External links

 Official U.S. Patent
 Telharmonium, Audion Piano, Luigi Russsolo et les bruitistes sonhors.free.fr, French
 The Telharmonium  the Telharmonium on '120 years Of Electronic Music'

Electronic musical instruments
American inventions
1897 musical instruments
History of Holyoke, Massachusetts